Girolamo Bentivoglio (died 12 April 1601) was a Roman Catholic prelate who served as Bishop of Corneto (Tarquinia) e Montefiascone (1580–1601).

Biography
On 7 October 1580, Girolamo Bentivoglio was appointed during the papacy of Pope Gregory XIII as Bishop of Corneto (Tarquinia) e Montefiascone.
On 13 November 1580, he was consecrated bishop by Giulio Antonio Santorio, Cardinal-Priest of San Bartolomeo all'Isola, with Thomas Goldwell, Bishop of Saint Asaph, and Filippo Spinola, Bishop of Nola, serving as co-consecrators. He served as Bishop of Corneto (Tarquinia) e Montefiascone until his death on 12 April 1601.

See also 
Catholic Church in Italy

References

External links and additional sources
 (for Chronology of Bishops) 
 (for Chronology of Bishops) 

16th-century Italian Roman Catholic bishops
17th-century Italian Roman Catholic bishops
Bishops appointed by Pope Gregory XIII
1601 deaths